was a village located in Sanbu District, Chiba Prefecture, Japan.

Hasunuma Village was formed on April 1, 1889 within Musha District. Musha District became part of Sanbu District from April 1, 1897.

On March 27, 2006, Hasunuma, along with the towns of Matsuo, Narutō and Sanbu (all from Sanbu District), was merged to create the city of Sanmu, and thus no longer exists as an independent municipality.

As of April 1, 2004, (the last census data prior to the merger) the village had an estimated population of 4,846 and a population density of 499 persons per km². The total area was 9.72 km².

Notable people
Takamasa Suzuki, former professional baseball player

External links
 Sanmu official website 

Dissolved municipalities of Chiba Prefecture
Sanmu